Guy Arvely Dolsin (born January 15, 1957 in Toamasina) is a Malagasy politician.  He is a member of the Senate of Madagascar for Boeny, and is a member of the Tiako I Madagasikara party.

References
Official page on the Senate website 

1957 births
Living people
Members of the Senate (Madagascar)
Tiako I Madagasikara politicians
People from Toamasina